The Haima M6 is a compact sedan produced in China since 2013 under the Haima brand replacing the Haima 3 or Haima Family compact cars.

Overview 
The Haima M6 debuted on the 2013 Shanghai Auto Show in April 2013 as a pre-production model with the official market launch in April 2015.

The Haima M6 is powered by the same engine unit as the Haima M5, which is 1.5-litre turbo inline-four engine producing 163hp and 220nm, mated to a six-speed manual transmission or a CVT.

2016 facelift
A minor facelift was launched shortly after in 2016 with the pricing of the Haima M6 ranging from 69,800 yuan to 102,800 yuan.

References

External links 

 Haima official website
 Haima series website 

Haima vehicles
Compact cars
Sedans
Front-wheel-drive vehicles
Cars introduced in 2013
Cars of China